Love & Gelato is a 2022 romantic comedy film directed by Brandon Camp and based on Jenna Evans Welch's 2016 young adult novel of the same title.

Plot 
The film follows Lina, a 17 year old American who travels to Rome to stay with two family friends before starting college, according to her deceased mother's wishes. While there, she meets and develops feelings for two boys, Lorenzo and Alessandro. Lina reads her mother's diary of visiting Italy at the same age and searches for her Italian father, whom she has not met.

Cast 

 Susanna Skaggs as Lina Emerson
 Valentina Lodovini as Francesca
 Owen McDonnell as Howard
 Saul Nanni as Alessandro Albani
 Tobia de Angelis as Lorenzo Ferazza
 Anjelika Washington as Addie
 Marie-France Carilla as Vicki
 Alex Boniello as Fleetwood Zach

Production 
Love & Gelato was written and directed by Brandon Camp. It was filmed in Italy and produced by Viola Prestieri, David Bertoni, and GT Film. The film is based on the 2016 young adult novel Love & Gelato by Jenna Evans Welch.

Release 
The film was announced on May 25, 2022 and released for streaming globally on Netflix on June 22 of the same year.

Reception 
The film has received mostly negative reviews from critics, holding a score of 22% on Rotten Tomatoes. In particular, reviews criticized its reliance on cliches and the shallowness of its writing. The film has also received criticism online from readers of the novel on which it is based.

References

External links
 
 

Films based on romance novels
Films directed by Brandon Camp
Films set in Rome
American romantic comedy films
Italian romantic comedy films
English-language Netflix original films
Italian-language Netflix original films
2020s American films
2020s Italian films